The Colorado Rockies' 1993 season was the first for the Rockies. They played in the National League West. Don Baylor was their manager. Playing their home games in a football stadium (Mile High Stadium), the Rockies set the all-time Major League record for attendance, drawing an incredible 4,483,350 fans. It is a record that stands to this day. They finished 37 games behind the NL West Champion Atlanta Braves with a record of 67-95, sixth in the division, only ahead of the San Diego Padres.

Vinny Castilla was the last player from the Rockies' inaugural season to retire, playing his last game at the end of 2006.

Offseason
November 9, 1992: Neifi Pérez was signed as an amateur free agent by the Colorado Rockies.
November 16, 1992: Andrés Galarraga was signed as a free agent by the Colorado Rockies.
November 17, 1992: Dante Bichette was traded by the Milwaukee Brewers to the Colorado Rockies for Kevin Reimer.
December 7, 1992: Bruce Ruffin was signed as a free agent by the Colorado Rockies.
December 7, 1992: Bryn Smith was signed as a free agent by the Colorado Rockies.

Draft picks 
The following players were selected in the 1992 Major League Baseball Draft.
John Burke was drafted by the Rockies in the first round.
Mark Thompson was drafted by the Rockies in the second round.
Roger Bailey was drafted by the Rockies in the third round.
Jason Bates was drafted by the Rockies in the seventh round.
Garvin Alston was drafted by the Rockies in the tenth round.
Craig Counsell was drafted by the Rockies in the eleventh round.
Juan Acevedo was drafted by the Rockies in the fourteenth round.
Angel Echevarria was drafted by the Rockies in the seventeenth round.
Quinton McCracken was drafted by the Rockies in the 25th round.
Mark Strittmatter was drafted by the Rockies in the 28th round.

Expansion draft
As opposed to previous expansion drafts such as the 1961 draft, players from both leagues were available to the expansion clubs. Each existing club could protect fifteen players on their roster from being drafted and only one player could be drafted from each team in the first round. Then for each additional round National League teams could protect an additional 3 players and American League teams could protect 4 more. All unprotected major and minor League players were eligible except those chosen in the amateur drafts of 1991 or 1992 and players who were 18 or younger when signed in 1990.

Round 1

Round 2

Round 3

1992 MLB June amateur draft and minor league affiliates 
The Rockies and Florida Marlins, set to debut in 1993, were allowed to participate in all rounds of the June 1992 MLB first-year player draft. The Rockies selected 27th overall in the first round, with pitcher John Burke their top pick. Of the 50 amateur free agents selected, ten made the major leagues, including Burke and—most prominently—Craig Counsell (11th round) and Quinton McCracken (25th). The Rockies affiliated with two minor league clubs during 1992 to develop drafted players.

1992 farm system

AZL club affiliation shared with Chicago Cubs

Regular season

Opening Day starters
Freddie Benavides
Dante Bichette
Jerald Clark
Alex Cole
Andrés Galarraga
Joe Girardi
Charlie Hayes
David Nied  (Bryn Smith was the starter for the home-opener)
Eric Young

Season standings

Record vs. opponents

Roster

Transactions
April 3, 1993: Dale Murphy was signed as a free agent by the Colorado Rockies.
April 29, 1993: Scott Aldred was selected off waivers by the Montreal Expos from the Colorado Rockies.
May 14, 1993: Mike Munoz was signed as a free agent by the Colorado Rockies.
May 19, 1993: Gerald Young was released by the Colorado Rockies.
June 2, 1993: Bryn Smith was released by the Colorado Rockies.
July 16, 1993: Kent Bottenfield was traded by the Montreal Expos to the Colorado Rockies for Butch Henry.
July 26, 1993: Brad Ausmus was traded by the Colorado Rockies with Doug Bochtler and a player to be named later to the San Diego Padres for Bruce Hurst and Greg Harris. The Colorado Rockies sent Andy Ashby (July 27, 1993) to the San Diego Padres to complete the trade.

Draft picks
The following players were selected in the 1993 Major League Baseball Draft.
Jamey Wright was drafted by the Rockies in the first round.
Bryan Rekar was drafted by the Rockies in the second round.
John Thomson was drafted by the Rockies in the seventh round.
Edgard Clemente was drafted by the Rockies in the tenth round.
Derrick Gibson was drafted by the Rockies in the thirteenth round.
Mark Brownson was drafted by the Rockies in the 30th round.
Terry Jones was drafted by the Rockies in the 40th round.

Major League debuts
Batters:
Jay Gainer (May 14)
Pedro Castellano (May 30)
Jayhawk Owens (Jun 6)
Roberto Mejía (Jul 15)
Pitchers:
Scott Fredrickson (Apr 29)
Lance Painter (May 19)
Curtis Leskanic (Jun 27)
Marcus Moore (Jul 9)

Game log

|-  style="text-align:center; background:#fbb;"
| 1 || April 5 || @ Mets || 3–0 || Gooden (1–0) || Nied (0–1) || || 53,127 || 0–1
|-  style="text-align:center; background:#fbb;"
| 2 || April 7 || @ Mets || 6–1 || Saberhagen (1–0) || Ruffin (0–1) || || 27,290 || 0–2 
|-  style="text-align:center; background:#bfb;"
| 3 || April 9 || Expos || 11–4 || Smith (1–0) || Bottenfield (0–1) || || 80,227 || 1–2
|-  style="text-align:center; background:#bfb;"
| 4 || April 10 || Expos || 9–5 || Nied (1–1) || Martínez (0–2) || || 65,261 || 2–2
|-  style="text-align:center; background:#fbb;"
| 5 || April 11 || Expos || 19–9 || Jones (1–0) || Henry (0–1) || || 66,987 || 2–3
|-  style="text-align:center; background:#fbb;"
| 6 || April 13 || Mets || 8–4 || Saberhagen (2–0) || Holmes (0–1) || || 52,087 || 2–4
|-  style="text-align:center; background:#fbb;"
| 7 || April 14 || Mets || 6–3 || Fernandez (1–0) || Smith (1–1) || Maddux (1) || 57,489 || 2–5
|-  style="text-align:center; background:#bfb;"
| 8 || April 15 || Mets || 5–3 || Nied (2–1) || Gooden (1–2) || || 52,608 || 3–5
|-  style="text-align:center; background:#fbb;"
| 9 || April 16 || @ Expos || 3–2 || Bottenfield (1–1) || Henry (0–2) || Rojas (4) || 17,483 || 3–6
|-  style="text-align:center; background:#bfb;"
| 10 || April 17 || @ Expos || 9–1 || Ruffin (1–1) || Martínez (0–3) || || 23,166 || 4–6
|-  style="text-align:center; background:#fbb;"
| 11 || April 18 || @ Expos || 4–2 || Hill (2–0) || Wayne (0–1) || || 25,034 || 4–7
|-  style="text-align:center; background:#fbb;"
| 12 || April 20 || @ Cardinals || 5–0 || Arocha (3–0) || Smith (1–2) || Olivares (1) || 30,516 || 4–8
|-  style="text-align:center; background:#bfb;"
| 13 || April 21 || @ Cardinals || 11–2 || Nied (3–1) || Magrane (0–2) || || 25,434 || 5–8
|-  style="text-align:center; background:#fbb;"
| 14 || April 22 || @ Cardinals || 5–2 || Perez (2–1) || Wayne (0–2) || Smith (6) || 34,218 || 5–9
|-  style="text-align:center; background:#bfb;"
| 15 || April 23 || Marlins || 5–4 || Reed (1–0) || Hammond (0–3) || Holmes (1) || 57,784 || 6–9
|-  style="text-align:center; background:#fbb;"
| 16 || April 24 || Marlins || 2–1 || Aquino (1–1) || Ashby (0–1) || Harvey (5) || 58,263 || 6–10
|-  style="text-align:center; background:#fbb;"
| 17 || April 25 || Marlins || 11–1 || Bowen (2–1) || Smith (1–3) || || 71,192 || 6–11
|-  style="text-align:center; background:#fbb;"
| 18 || April 26 || Cubs || 6–3 || Harkey (3–0) || Nied (3–2) || Myers (6) || 48,768 || 6–12
|-  style="text-align:center; background:#bfb;"
| 19 || April 27 || Cubs || 11–2 || Henry (1–2) || Morgan (1–4) || || 48,328 || 7–12
|-  style="text-align:center; background:#fbb;"
| 20 || April 28 || Cardinals || 7–6 || Murphy (1–1) || Holmes (0–2) || Smith (9) || 49,765 || 7–13
|-  style="text-align:center; background:#fbb;"
| 21 || April 29 || Cardinals || 5–2 || Tewksbury (1–3) || Ashby (0–2) || Smith (10) || 57,472 || 7–14
|-  style="text-align:center; background:#bfb;"
| 22 || April 30 || @ Marlins || 6–2 || Reynoso (1–0) || Bowen (2–2) || || 42,535 || 8–14
|-

|-  style="text-align:center; background:#fbb;"
| 23 || May 1 || @ Marlins || 7–6 || Harvey (1–1) || Reed (1–1) || || 43,583 || 8–15
|-  style="text-align:center; background:#bfb;"
| 24 || May 2 || @ Marlins || 2–1 || Henry (2–2) || Armstrong (2–3) || Holmes (2) || 41,370 || 9–15
|-  style="text-align:center; background:#bfb;"
| 25 || May 4 || @ Cubs || 14–13 || Blair (1–0) || McElroy (1–1) || || 32,199 || 10–15
|-  style="text-align:center; background:#fbb;"
| 26 || May 5 || @ Cubs || 3–2 || Hibbard (2–2) || Reynoso (1–1) || Myers (8) || 20,266 || 10–16
|-  style="text-align:center; background:#fbb;"
| 27 || May 6 || Braves || 13–3 || Smoltz (3–3) || Nied (3–3) || || 50,618 || 10–17
|-  style="text-align:center; background:#fbb;"
| 28 || May 7 || Braves || 13–5 || Freeman (1–0) || Parrett (0–1) || || 65,429 || 10–18
|-  style="text-align:center; background:#fbb;"
| 29 || May 8 || Braves || 8–7 || Mercker (2–0) || Fredrickson (0–1) || Stanton (11) || 64,614 || 10–19
|-  style="text-align:center; background:#fbb;"
| 30 || May 9 || Braves || 12–7 || McMichael (1–1) || Reed (1–2) || || 70,786 || 10–20
|-  style="text-align:center; background:#bfb;"
| 31 || May 10 || Giants || 7–4 || Reynoso (2–1) || Wilson (0–3) || || 50,705 || 11–20
|-  style="text-align:center; background:#fbb;"
| 32 || May 11 || Giants || 5–3 || Swift (4–1) || Nied (3–4) || Beck (8) || 49,072 || 11–21
|-  style="text-align:center; background:#fbb;"
| 33 || May 12 || Giants || 8–2 || Black (3–0) || Henry (2–3) || || 50,105 || 11–22
|-  style="text-align:center; background:#fbb;"
| 34 || May 13 || Giants || 13–8 || Burkett (6–0) || Ruffin (1–2) || || 58,833 || 11–23
|-  style="text-align:center; background:#fbb;"
| 35 || May 14 || @ Reds || 13–5 || Pugh (3–3) || Ashby (0–3) || || 48,352 || 11–24
|-  style="text-align:center; background:#fbb;"
| 36 || May 15 || @ Reds || 5–3 || Hill (3–0) || Reynoso (2–2) || Reardon (6) || 49,697 || 11–25
|-  style="text-align:center; background:#fbb;"
| 37 || May 16 || @ Reds || 14–2 || Roper (1–0) || Nied (3–5) || || 35,434 || 11–26
|-  style="text-align:center; background:#fbb;"
| 38 || May 17 || @ Padres || 4–0 || Benes (6–3) || Henry (2–4) || || 15,251 || 11–27
|-  style="text-align:center; background:#bfb;"
| 39 || May 18 || @ Padres || 2–1 || Wayne (1–2) || Rodriguez (1–2) || Holmes (3) || 15,347 || 12–27
|-  style="text-align:center; background:#fbb;"
| 40 || May 19 || @ Padres || 7–3 || Harris (4–5) || Painter (0–1) || || 12,773 || 12–28
|-  style="text-align:center; background:#fbb;"
| 41 || May 20 || @ Padres || 5–4 || Harris (3–0) || Holmes (0–3) || || 22,098 || 12–29
|-  style="text-align:center; background:#fbb;"
| 42 || May 21 || @ Dodgers || 8–0 || Hershiser (5–4) || Nied (3–6) || || 51,818 || 12–30
|-  style="text-align:center; background:#fbb;"
| 43 || May 22 || @ Dodgers || 4–3 || McDowell (2–0) || Henry (2–5) || Gott (6) || 50,537 || 12–31
|-  style="text-align:center; background:#fbb;"
| 44 || May 23 || @ Dodgers || 4–0 || Martinez (3–3) || Blair (1–1) || || 48,343 || 12–32
|-  style="text-align:center; background:#bfb;"
| 45 || May 25 || @ Astros || 7–5 || Wayne (2–2) || Hernandez (2–1) || Ashby (1) || 18,812 || 13–32
|-  style="text-align:center; background:#bfb;"
| 46 || May 26 || @ Astros  || 3–2 || Smith (2–3) || Jones (1–4) || Parrett (1) || 22,267 || 14–32
|-  style="text-align:center; background:#fbb;"
| 47 || May 27 || @ Astros  || 8–0 || Drabek (5–5) || Nied (3–7) || || 22,372 || 14–33
|-  style="text-align:center; background:#fbb;"
| 48 || May 28 || Phillies || 15–9 || Rivera (3–2) || Henry (2–6) || || 58,312 || 14–34
|-  style="text-align:center; background:#fbb;"
| 49 || May 29 || Phillies || 6–0 || Mulholland (6–4) || Blair (1–2) || || 56,263 || 14–35
|-  style="text-align:center; background:#fbb;"
| 50 || May 30 || Phillies || 18–1 || Greene (7–0) || Painter (0–2) || || 56,710 || 14–36
|-  style="text-align:center; background:#bfb;"
| 51 || May 31 || Pirates || 6–2 || Reynoso (3–2) || Wakefield (3–5) || || 47,665 || 15–36
|-

|-  style="text-align:center; background:#fbb;"
| 52 || June 1 || Pirates || 8–6 || Walk (7–3) || Smith (2–4) || || 45,752 || 15–37
|-  style="text-align:center; background:#fbb;"
| 53 || June 2 || Pirates || 5–3 || Petkovsek (1–0) || Parrett (0–2) || Belinda (11) || 50,122 || 15–38
|-  style="text-align:center; background:#bfb;"
| 54 || June 4 || @ Phillies || 2–1 || Blair (2–2) || Mulholland (6–5) || Wayne (1) || 43,333 || 16–38
|-  style="text-align:center; background:#fbb;"
| 55 || June 5 || @ Phillies || 6–2 || Greene (8–0) || Reynoso (3–3) || || 43,837 || 16–39
|-  style="text-align:center; background:#fbb;"
| 56 || June 6 || @ Phillies || 11–7 || Schilling (7–1) || Ashby (0–4) || || 55,714 || 16–40
|-  style="text-align:center; background:#bfb;"
| 57 || June 8 || @ Pirates || 4–1 || Ruffin (2–2) || Wagner (1–3) || Shepherd (1) || 16,722 || 17–40
|-  style="text-align:center; background:#fbb;"
| 58 || June 9 || @ Pirates || 4–1 || Neagle (2–1) || Blair (2–3) || Belinda (13) || 30,625 || 17–41
|-  style="text-align:center; background:#bfb;"
| 59 || June 11 || Astros || 5–4 || Parrett (1–2) || Hernandez (2–2) || Holmes (4) || 57,136 || 18–41
|-  style="text-align:center; background:#bfb;"
| 60 || June 12 || Astros || 14–11 || Shepherd (1–0) || Jones (3–5) || || 60,864 || 19–41
|-  style="text-align:center; background:#bfb;"
| 61 || June 13 || Astros || 9–1 || Ruffin (3–2) || Swindell (5–6) || || 60,349 || 20–41
|-  style="text-align:center; background:#fbb;"
| 62 || June 14 || Dodgers || 9–4 || Astacio (5–4) || Blair (2–4) || || 51,475 || 20–42
|-  style="text-align:center; background:#fbb;"
| 63 || June 15 || Dodgers || 12–4 || McDowell (3–0) || Shepherd (1–1) || || 55,772 || 20–43
|-  style="text-align:center; background:#bfb;"
| 64 || June 16 || Dodgers || 7–6 || Reynoso (4–3) || Gross (5–5) || Grant (1) || 51,765 || 21–43
|-  style="text-align:center; background:#fbb;"
| 65 || June 18 || Padres || 11–1 || Harris (7–7) || Ruffin (3–3) || || 52,159 || 21–44
|-  style="text-align:center; background:#bfb;"
| 66 || June 19 || Padres || 17–3 || Blair (3–4) || Taylor (0–5) || || 55,603 || 22–44
|-  style="text-align:center; background:#bfb;"
| 67 || June 20 || Padres || 3–1 || Reed (2–2) || Mason (0–5) || Holmes (5) || 63,661 || 23–44
|-  style="text-align:center; background:#bfb;"
| 68 || June 21 || Reds || 5–4 || Reed (3–2) || Reardon (1–1) || || 51,835 || 24–44
|-  style="text-align:center; background:#fbb;"
| 69 || June 22 || Reds || 16–13 || Wickander (1–0) || Grant (0–1) || Dibble (6) || 58,597 || 24–45
|-  style="text-align:center; background:#bfb;"
| 70 || June 23 || Reds || 15–5 || Parrett (2–2) || Pugh (3–9) || || 60,282 || 25–45
|-  style="text-align:center; background:#fbb;"
| 71 || June 24 || @ Giants || 17–2 || Burkett (11–2) || Blair (3–5) || || 39,827 || 25–46
|-  style="text-align:center; background:#fbb;"
| 72 || June 25 || @ Giants || 7–2 || Hickerson (1–1) || Henry (2–7) || || 30,722 || 25–47
|-  style="text-align:center; background:#bfb;"
| 73 || June 26 || @ Giants || 5–1 || Reynoso (5–3) || Wilson (5–4) || || 39,327 || 26–47
|-  style="text-align:center; background:#fbb;"
| 74 || June 27 || @ Giants || 5–0 || Swift (10–4) || Leskanic (0–1) || || 45,408 || 26–48
|-  style="text-align:center; background:#fbb;"
| 75 || June 29 || @ Braves || 6–4 || Smoltz (7–7) || Ruffin (3–4) || Stanton (21) || 48,974 || 26–49
|-  style="text-align:center; background:#fbb;"
| 76 || June 30 || @ Braves || 3–2 || Wohlers (2–0) || Shepherd (1–2) || || 48,791 || 26–50
|-

|-  style="text-align:center; background:#fbb;"
| 77 || July 1 || @ Braves || 4–0 || Glavine (10–3) || Reynoso (5–4) || || 45,252 || 26–51
|-  style="text-align:center; background:#fbb;"
| 78 || July 2 || Cubs || 11–8 || Bautista (3–2) || Shepherd (1–3) || Myers (25) || 62,037 || 26–52
|-  style="text-align:center; background:#bfb;"
| 79 || July 3 || Cubs || 5–4 || Reed (4–2) || Myers (1–2) || || 63,826 || 27–52
|-  style="text-align:center; background:#bfb;"
| 80 || July 4 || Cubs || 3–1 || Parrett (3–2) || Morgan (5–9) || Holmes (6) || 59,259 || 28–52
|-  style="text-align:center; background:#fbb;"
| 81 || July 5 || Cubs || 10–1 || Harkey (6–2) || Blair (3–6) || || 55,185 || 28–53
|-  style="text-align:center; background:#bfb;"
| 82 || July 6 || Marlins || 8–3 || Reynoso (6–4) || Hough (4–9) || || 47,528 || 29–53
|-  style="text-align:center; background:#bfb;"
| 83 || July 7 || Marlins || 6–5 || Reed (5–2) || Harvey (1–2) || || 50,707 || 30–53
|-  style="text-align:center; background:#bfb;"
| 84 || July 8 || Marlins || 3–2 || Leskanic (1–1) || Rapp (0–1) || Holmes (7) || 56,807 || 31–53
|-  style="text-align:center; background:#bfb;"
| 85 || July 9 || @ Cardinals || 5–4 || Moore (1–0) || Smith (2–2) || Holmes (8) || 41,466 || 32–53
|-  style="text-align:center; background:#fbb;"
| 86 || July 10 || @ Cardinals || 9–3 || Osborne (8–3) || Henry (2–8) || || 53,146 || 32–54
|-  style="text-align:center; background:#bfb;"
| 87 || July 11 || @ Cardinals || 4–1 || Reynoso (7–4) || Tewksbury (9–7) || Reed (1) || 44,105 || 33–54
|-  style="text-align:center; background:#fbb;"
| 88 || July 15 || @ Cubs || 1–0 || Morgan (7–9) || Blair (3–7) || || 38,765 || 33–55
|-  style="text-align:center; background:#fbb;"
| 89 || July 16 || @ Cubs || 8–2 || Guzmán (8–7) || Leskanic (1–2) || || 39,281 || 33–56
|-  style="text-align:center; background:#fbb;"
| 90 || July 17 || @ Cubs || 5–1 || Harkey (7–3) || Reynoso (7–5) || || 39,522 || 33–57
|-  style="text-align:center; background:#fbb;"
| 91 || July 18 || @ Cubs || 12–2 || Hibbard (8–6) || Parrett (3–3) || || 39,022 || 33–58
|-  style="text-align:center; background:#fbb;"
| 92 || July 19 || @ Marlins || 3–1 || Bowen (5–9) || Bottenfield (2–6) || Harvey (26) || 37,703 || 33–59
|-  style="text-align:center; background:#bfb;"
| 93 || July 20 || @ Marlins || 6–3 || Blair (4–7) || Hammond (10–6) || Holmes (9) || 31,852 || 34–59
|-  style="text-align:center; background:#fbb;"
| 94 || July 21 || @ Marlins || 6–4 || Rapp (1–2) || Leskanic (1–3) || Harvey (27) || 32,129 || 34–60
|-  style="text-align:center; background:#bfb;"
| 95 || July 22 || Cardinals || 7–6 || Holmes (1–3) || Burns (0–5) || || 56,013 || 35–60
|-  style="text-align:center; background:#fbb;"
| 96 || July 23 || Cardinals || 13–11 || Watson (2–0) || Reed (5–3) || Smith (34) || 58,513 || 35–61
|-  style="text-align:center; background:#bfb;"
| 97 || July 24 || Cardinals || 9–8 || Bottenfield (3–6) || Osborne (9–4) || Holmes (10) || 71,784 || 36–61
|-  style="text-align:center; background:#fbb;"
| 98 || July 25 || Cardinals || 5–4 || Olivares (3–2) || Wayne (2–3) || Guetterman (1) || 65,211 || 36–62
|-  style="text-align:center; background:#fbb;"
| 99 || July 26 || Braves || 12–7 || Maddux (11–8) || Leskanic (1–4) || || 62,937 || 36–63
|-  style="text-align:center; background:#fbb;"
| 100 || July 27 || Braves || 10–5 || Smoltz (9–8) || Reynoso (7–6) || || 54,550 || 36–64
|-  style="text-align:center; background:#fbb;"
| 101 || July 28 || Braves || 3–2 || Wohlers (5–0) || Reed (5–4) || McMichael (1) || 60,237 || 36–65
|-  style="text-align:center; background:#fbb;"
| 102 || July 30 || Giants || 10–4 || Brummett (2–3) || Harris (10–10) || || 71,710 || 36–66
|-  style="text-align:center; background:#fbb;"
| 103 || July 31 || Giants || 4–3 || Swift (15–5) || Bottenfield (3–7) || Beck (30) || 72,208 || 36–67
|-

|-  style="text-align:center; background:#fbb;"
| 104 || August 1 || Giants || 6–5 || Burkett (16–4) || Reynoso (7–7) || Beck (31) || 72,431 || 36–68
|-  style="text-align:center; background:#fbb;"
| 105 || August 2 || @ Reds || 6–2 || Pugh (7–10) || Blair (4–8) || || 29,088 || 36–69
|-  style="text-align:center; background:#fbb;"
| 106 || August 3 || @ Reds || 5–4 || Spradlin (1–0) || Leskanic (1–5) || || 26,982 || 36–70
|-  style="text-align:center; background:#fbb;"
| 107 || August 4 || @ Reds || 9–3 || Roper (2–1) || Harris (10–11) || || 22,939 || 36–71
|-  style="text-align:center; background:#fbb;"
| 108 || August 5 || @ Reds || 11–4 || Rijo (10–5) || Bottenfield (3–8) || || 33,871 || 36–72
|-  style="text-align:center; background:#fbb;"
| 109 || August 6 || @ Padres || 6–3 || Benes (13–7) || Reynoso (7–8) || Hoffman (3) || || 36–73
|-  style="text-align:center; background:#fbb;"
| 110 || August 6 || @ Padres || 6–2 || Sanders (1–0) || Blair (4–9) || || 41,085 || 36–74
|-  style="text-align:center; background:#bfb;"
| 111 || August 8 || @ Padres || 5–2 || Sanford (1–0) || Brocail (2–8) || Holmes (11) || 15,248 || 37–74
|-  style="text-align:center; background:#bfb;"
| 112 || August 9 || @ Dodgers || 3–2 || Reed (6–4) || Gott (4–6) || Holmes (12) || 31,953 || 38–74
|-  style="text-align:center; background:#bfb;"
| 113 || August 10 || @ Dodgers || 4–2 || Bottenfield (4–8) || Astacio (8–7) || || 34,163 || 39–74
|-  style="text-align:center; background:#bfb;"
| 114 || August 11 || @ Dodgers || 3–2 || Reynoso (8–8) || Martínez (8–7) || Reed (2) || 38,421 || 40–74
|-  style="text-align:center; background:#bfb;"
| 115 || August 12 || @ Dodgers || 4–1 || Blair (5–9) || Hershiser (8–12) || || 38,549 || 41–74
|-  style="text-align:center; background:#bfb;"
| 116 || August 13 || @ Astros || 5–3 || Wayne (3–3) || Jones (3–9) || Holmes (13) || 37,972 || 42–74
|-  style="text-align:center; background:#fbb;"
| 117 || August 14 || @ Astros || 9–0 || Harnisch (11–8) || Harris (10–12) || || 41,523 || 42–75
|-  style="text-align:center; background:#bfb;"
| 118 || August 15 || @ Astros || 4–3 || Ruffin (4–4) || Hernandez (3–3) || Holmes (14) || 21,690 || 43–75
|-  style="text-align:center; background:#fbb;"
| 119 || August 17 || Phillies || 10–7 || Rivera (11–6) || Reynoso (8–9) || Williams (33) || 63,183 || 43–76
|-  style="text-align:center; background:#fbb;"
| 120 || August 18 || Phillies || 7–6 || Thigpen (2–0) || Ruffin (4–5) || Williams (34) || 61,056 || 43–77
|-  style="text-align:center; background:#bfb;"
| 121 || August 19 || Phillies || 6–5 || Moore (2–0) || Mason (4–9) || Holmes (15) || 53,443 || 44–77
|-  style="text-align:center; background:#bfb;"
| 122 || August 21 || Mets || 4–3 || Harris (11–12) || Innis (1–3) || Holmes (16) || || 45–77
|-  style="text-align:center; background:#bfb;"
| 123 || August 21 || Mets || 8–6 || Reed (7–4) || Jones (1–1) || Holmes (17) || 60,613 || 46–77
|-  style="text-align:center; background:#bfb;"
| 124 || August 22 || Mets || 4–3 || Munoz (1–1) || Fernandez (2–4) || Reed (3) || 70,064 || 47–77
|-  style="text-align:center; background:#bfb;"
| 125 || August 23 || @ Phillies || 3–2 || Wayne (4–3) || Mason (4–10) || Holmes (18) || 40,481 || 48–77
|-  style="text-align:center; background:#fbb;"
| 126 || August 24 || @ Phillies || 4–2 || Jackson (10–9) || Blair (5–10) || Williams (36) || 43,419 || 48–78
|-  style="text-align:center; background:#fbb;"
| 127 || August 25 || @ Phillies || 8–5 || Schilling (11–6) || Sanford (1–1) || || 46,448 || 48–79
|-  style="text-align:center; background:#fbb;"
| 128 || August 26 || @ Mets || 7–1 || Gooden (12–14) || Harris (11–13) || || 20,062 || 48–80
|-  style="text-align:center; background:#fbb;"
| 129 || August 27 || @ Mets || 3–2 || Fernandez (3–4) || Bottenfield (4–9) || Innis (3) || 21,765 || 48–81
|-  style="text-align:center; background:#bfb;"
| 130 || August 28 || @ Mets || 7–5 || Reynoso (9–9) || Jones (1–2) || Holmes (19) || 25,238 || 49–81
|-  style="text-align:center; background:#bfb;"
| 131 || August 29 || @ Mets || 6–1 || Painter (1–2) || Tanana (6–13) || || 25,774 || 50–81
|-  style="text-align:center; background:#fbb;"
| 132 || August 30 || Expos || 6–1 || Fassero (10–3) || Sanford (1–2) || Rojas (10) || 47,699 || 50–82
|-  style="text-align:center; background:#fbb;"
| 133 || August 31 || Expos || 14–3 || Heredia (3–2) || Harris (11–14) || || 46,288 || 50–83
|-

|-  style="text-align:center; background:#fbb;"
| 134 || September 1 || Expos || 11–3 || Martínez (13–8) || Bottenfield (4–10) || || 46,781 || 50–84
|-  style="text-align:center; background:#bfb;"
| 135 || September 3 || Pirates || 7–6 || Holmes (2–3) || Dewey (1–1) || || 51,512 || 51–84
|-  style="text-align:center; background:#bfb;"
| 136 || September 4 || Pirates || 10–4 || Painter (2–2) || Wakefield (4–9) || || 56,113 || 52–84
|-  style="text-align:center; background:#bfb;"
| 137 || September 5 || Pirates || 4–1 || Ruffin (5–5) || Walk (12–13) || Holmes (20) || 54,034 || 53–84
|-  style="text-align:center; background:#fbb;"
| 138 || September 6 || @ Expos || 4–3 || Scott (5–2) || Reed (7–5) || Wetteland (34) || 40,066 || 53–85
|-  style="text-align:center; background:#fbb;"
| 139 || September 7 || @ Expos || 4–3 || Martínez (14–8) || Moore (2–1) || Wetteland (35) || 18,988 || 53–86
|-  style="text-align:center; background:#fbb;"
| 140 || September 8 || @ Expos || 6–1 || Rueter (7–0) || Reynoso (9–10) || Scott (1) || 10,764 || 53–87
|-  style="text-align:center; background:#bfb;"
| 141 || September 9 || @ Pirates || 10–7 || Wayne (5–3) || Johnston (2–3) || || 10,016 || 54–87
|-  style="text-align:center; background:#bfb;"
| 142 || September 10 || @ Pirates || 9–8 || Moore (3–1) || Minor (7–6) || Holmes (21) || 15,335 || 55–87
|-  style="text-align:center; background:#bfb;"
| 143 || September 11 || @ Pirates || 3–2 || Bottenfield (5–10) || Wakefield (4–10) || Ruffin (1) || 21,649 || 56–87
|-  style="text-align:center; background:#fbb;"
| 144 || September 12 || @ Pirates || 4–3 || Menéndez (2–0) || Munoz (1–2) || || 21,032 || 56–88
|-  style="text-align:center; background:#bfb;"
| 145 || September 14 || Astros || 9–4 || Reynoso (10–10) || Drabek (8–16) || Ruffin (2) || || 57–88
|-  style="text-align:center; background:#bfb;"
| 146 || September 14 || Astros || 6–5 || Holmes (3–3) || Hernandez (3–5) || || 42,657 || 58–88
|-  style="text-align:center; background:#bfb;"
| 147 || September 15 || Astros || 6–4 || Munoz (2–2) || Williams (4–4) || Holmes (22) || 40,813 || 59–88
|-  style="text-align:center; background:#bfb;"
| 148 || September 16 || Astros || 6–3 || Ruffin (6–5) || Jones (1–2) || Holmes (23) || 41,847 || 60–88
|-  style="text-align:center; background:#bfb;"
| 149 || September 17 || Dodgers || 12–3 || Nied (4–7) || Candiotti (8–8) || || 56,679 || 61–88
|-  style="text-align:center; background:#fbb;"
| 150 || September 18 || Dodgers || 9–0 || Astacio (13–8) || Hurst (0–2) || || 52,293 || 61–89
|-  style="text-align:center; background:#bfb;"
| 151 || September 19 || Dodgers || 8–5 || Reynoso (11–10) || Martínez (10–4) || Holmes (24) || 61,573 || 62–89
|-  style="text-align:center; background:#fbb;"
| 152 || September 20 || Padres || 11–7 || Seminara (3–2) || Harris (11–15) || Hoffman (5) || 41,531 || 62–90
|-  style="text-align:center; background:#bfb;"
| 153 || September 21 || Padres || 15–4 || Blair (6–10) || Worrell (1–7) || || 42,727 || 63–90
|-  style="text-align:center; background:#bfb;"
| 154 || September 22 || Padres || 11–4 || Nied (5–7) || Benes (15–14) || || 41,061 || 64–90
|-  style="text-align:center; background:#bfb;"
| 155 || September 24 || Reds || 9–2 || Reed (8–5) || Ayala (6–10) || || 57,330 || 65–90
|-  style="text-align:center; background:#fbb;"
| 156 || September 25 || Reds || 6–0 || Rijo (14–8) || Harris (11–16) || || 61,179 || 65–91
|-  style="text-align:center; background:#bfb;"
| 157 || September 26 || Reds || 12–7 || Reynoso (12–10) || Luebbers (2–5) || || 70,069 || 66–91
|-  style="text-align:center; background:#fbb;"
| 158 || September 28 || @ Giants || 6–4 || Hickerson (7–5) || Nied (5–8) || Beck (45) || 28,568 || 66–92
|-  style="text-align:center; background:#bfb;"
| 159 || September 29 || @ Giants || 5–3 || Reed (9–5) || Torres (3–4) || Holmes (25) || 39,377 || 67–92
|-

|-  style="text-align:center; background:#fbb;"
| 160 || October 1 || @ Braves || 7–4 || Avery (18–6) || Harris (11–17) || McMichael (18) || 48,968 || 67–93
|-  style="text-align:center; background:#fbb;"
| 161 || October 2 || @ Braves || 10–1 || Maddux (20–10) || Reynoso (12–11) || || 48,899 || 67–94
|-  style="text-align:center; background:#fbb;"
| 162 || October 3 || @ Braves || 5–3 || Glavine (22–6) || Nied (5–9) || McMichael (19) || 48,904 || 67–95
|-

Player stats

Batting

Starters by position 
Note: Pos = Position; G = Games played; AB = At bats; H = Hits; Avg. = Batting average; HR = Home runs; RBI = Runs batted in

Other batters 
Note: G = Games played; AB = At bats; H = Hits; Avg. = Batting average; HR = Home runs; RBI = Runs batted in

Pitching

Starting pitchers 
Note: G = Games pitched; IP = Innings pitched; W = Wins; L = Losses; ERA = Earned run average; SO = Strikeouts

Other pitchers 
Note: G = Games pitched; IP = Innings pitched; W = Wins; L = Losses; ERA = Earned run average; SO = Strikeouts

Relief pitchers 
Note: G = Games pitched; W = Wins; L = Losses; SV = Saves; ERA = Earned run average; SO = Strikeouts

Farm system

References

1993 Rockies at Baseball Reference
1993 Colorado Rockies team page at www.baseball-almanac.co

Colorado Rockies seasons
Inaugural Major League Baseball seasons by team
Colorado Rockies
Colorado Rockies season
1990s in Denver